Vince Sulyok (7 July 1932 – 9 August 2009) was a Hungarian-Norwegian librarian and poet.

He was born in Hungary. His job was at the University Library of Oslo, where he was a first librarian. He issued several poetry collections in Hungarian, and translated Norwegian and Danish poetry into Hungarian. He also issued non-fiction books such as Ungarns historie og kultur (1994). He died in August 2009 in Asker, having resided at Billingstad and previously at Åsterud.

References

1932 births
2009 deaths
Hungarian emigrants to Norway
20th-century Norwegian poets
Norwegian male poets
Norwegian librarians
20th-century Norwegian male writers